Ramón Malla i Call (4 September 1922 – 18 April 2014) was Bishop of Lleida. From 1969 until 1971 he was Apostolic Administrator of the Diocese of Urgell during a sede vacante and therefore acting Episcopal Co-Prince of Andorra. He was born in La Seu d'Urgell, Catalonia. He was ordained as priest on 16 December 1948, in Salamanca.  On 24 July 1968 he was consecrated bishop of Lleida. On 19 December 1999 he became Emeritus Bishop.

External links 
 Ramon Malla at Bisbat de Lleida  
 Andorra Episcopal co-princes
 

|-

1922 births
2014 deaths
20th-century Princes of Andorra
People from La Seu d'Urgell
Bishops of Lleida
Bishops of Urgell
20th-century Roman Catholic bishops in Spain